Gollancz Prize may refer to:

Sir Israel Gollancz Prize (established 1924), awarded to scholars of the English language by the British Academy
Victor Gollancz Prize (established 2000), human rights award given by the Society for Threatened Peoples